James Sutherland,  (July 17, 1849 – May 3, 1905) was a Canadian politician.

Born in Ancaster Township, Canada West, he was a merchant before being elected to the House of Commons of Canada for the riding of Oxford North in an 1880 by-election. A Liberal, he was re-elected in 1882, 1887, 1891, 1896, 1900, and 1904. From 1896 to 1900, he was the Chief Government Whip. He subsequently joined the Cabinet of Sir Wilfrid Laurier and was successively Minister without Portfolio, Minister of Marine and Fisheries, and Minister of Public Works.

He died in office at the age of 55.

References
 

Liberal Party of Canada MPs
Members of the House of Commons of Canada from Ontario
Members of the King's Privy Council for Canada
1849 births
1905 deaths